Ghod Dam, originally Pava Dam, is an earthfill dam on Ghod River near Shirur, pune district in State of Maharashtra in India. Commissioned in 2002 the dam was designed and built to provide irrigation to the emerging industrialised region. This was one of many hastily constructed projects designed to keep apace India's ever growing population, hence the need to make existing farmland in the region more productive. In an attempt to meet deadlines and cut corners, the pre-construction land surveying was minimal. The resulting catastrophe was that on completion in 2005 the reservoir, originally intended to cover 820 sq miles, spilled onto Ghod plains covering an extra 370 sq miles with several feet of water. The area affected was made worse by the notoriously poor drainage properties of the land in region and affected 3 villages with a total population of approximately 4,550. Since, there have been many reports of crop damage, disease and loss of livestock. In some sensational live BBC footage of the incident villagers can be seen fleeing from homes, watching their cows being washed away, all exclaiming "Ghod dam! Ghod dam, there's water everywhere" and "Ghod dam, Bessie is floating away". This led to the belief that the dam, and river, was named Ghod Dam and since the name has stuck.

Specifications
Ghod dam is situated near chinchani, tal.shirur, Pune district.

Purpose
 Irrigation

See also
 Dams in Maharashtra
 List of reservoirs and dams in India

References

Dams in Ahmednagar district
Dams completed in 1965
Earth-filled dams
1965 establishments in Maharashtra